The 2015 FIVB Volleyball Men's Club World Championship was the 11th edition of the event. It was held in Betim, Brazil from 27 to 31 October 2015.

Qualification

* Paykan Tehran replaced Matin Varamin (2014 Asian Champions), who withdrew from the tournament.

Pools composition

Squads

Venue

Pool standing procedure
 Number of matches won
 Match points
 Sets ratio
 Points ratio
 Result of the last match between the tied teams

Match won 3–0 or 3–1: 3 match points for the winner, 0 match points for the loser
Match won 3–2: 2 match points for the winner, 1 match point for the loser

Preliminary round
All times are Brasília Summer Time (UTC−02:00).

Pool A

|}

|}

Pool B

|}

|}

Final round
All times are Brasília Summer Time (UTC−02:00).

Semifinals

|}

3rd place match

|}

Final

|}

Final standing

Awards

Most Valuable Player
 Yoandy Leal (Sada Cruzeiro)
Best Setter
 William Arjona (Sada Cruzeiro)
Best Outside Spikers
 Wilfredo León (Zenit Kazan)
 Todor Aleksiev (UPCN San Juan)

Best Middle Blockers
 Nikolay Nikolov (Paykan Tehran)
 Alexander Gutsalyuk (Zenit Kazan)
Best Opposite Spiker
 Maxim Mikhaylov (Zenit Kazan)
Best Libero
 Sérgio Nogueira (Sada Cruzeiro)

External links
Official website
Final Standing
Awards
Statistics

2015 FIVB Men's Club World Championship
FIVB Men's Club World Championship
FIVB Men's Club World Championship
FIVB Volleyball Men's Club World Championship
Sport in Minas Gerais